Ernie "Mush" Callaghan BEM (21 January 1910 – 5 May 1972) was an English footballer. He played as a defender for several small clubs before being signed for Aston Villa F.C. in 1930. He played for them for 125 league games and in 17 cup matches.

Some of his previous clubs included Hinckley Athletic, Atherstone Town, Cradley Heath, West Bromwich Albion on a trial and Birmingham City on a trial.
 
Callaghan was a member of the legendary Aston Villa team that refused to perform a Nazi salute on their famous 1938 tour of Germany.

During the Second World War he was also a constable in Birmingham City Police. On the night of 28 July 1942, he and Police Sergeant Harold Wood attended the factory of Gabriel's Ltd on Coleshill Street in Birmingham which had been bombed. They helped rescue trapped workers and with a civilian James Hughes the three men received gallantry awards. For his part Ernie Callaghan received the British Empire Medal (B.E.M.).

He previously held the Aston Villa club record for the oldest first team player, being 39 years 86 days old when he played against Grimsby Town in 1946. In his last game in April 1947, he was 39 years and 257 days. On 1 February 2011, American goalkeeper Brad Friedel set a new club record by playing a first-team game away at Manchester United ages 39 years and 259 days.

Callaghan used to be the groundskeeper for Aston Villa and lived in a house on site. He had two sons, Keith and Roy.

See also
 Aston Villa F.C. statistics
 List of Aston Villa F.C. players

References

External links
 Player Stats on fanbase

1910 births
1972 deaths
Aston Villa F.C. players
Atherstone Town F.C. players
Association football defenders
English footballers